Ahan Shahr (also Romanized as Āhan Shahr) is a village in Mobarakeh Rural District, in the Central District of Bafq County, Yazd Province, Iran. At the 2006 census, its population was 1,079, in 280 families.

References 

Populated places in Bafq County